"My Baby Loves a Bunch of Authors" is a song by Canadian pop group Moxy Früvous. It was written for the CBC Radio show Later the Same Day, as a comment on a Toronto literary festival. It mentions famous authors, many Canadian.

The song was first recorded for their self-titled independent cassette in 1992. It was re-recorded in 1993 for their debut album, Bargainville, with a few changes to the lyrics, including the replacement of some authors with others. This second version is the one best known to fans, and also the one performed live by the band, as on their live album Live Noise.

The song tells the story of a man whose girlfriend seems to be more interested in books than in him. The man is frustrated when he starts having other reading-related problems (such as his doctor delaying their appointment until after he finishes his book, and his relationship counsellor giving him a bunch of books to read). Eventually he comes around, however, when he and his significant other attend an author's night event where they meet and party with several famous authors, leading the singer to declare, "these writer types are a scream!" The band tweaked the song in reaction to events. The Robertson Davies couplet was originally "Who needs a shave? He's/Robertson Davies!" After the author's death in 1995, the band replaced the word "shave" with "grave."

In the album version, the authors mentioned are, in order:

Gabriel García Márquez 
William S. Burroughs (not in the original version)
bell hooks (Jane Rule in the original version)
Pierre Berton
Mario Puzo (Daniel Richler in the original version)
W.P. Kinsella
Margaret Atwood
Robertson Davies (mentioned twice in the original version)
Michael Ondaatje
Doris Lessing

The tabloid newspaper, the Toronto Sun, is also mentioned.

Songs about writers
Music based on novels
1992 songs
Moxy Früvous songs